The 138th district of the Texas House of Representatives contains parts of northwestern Houston. The current Representative is Lacey Hull, who was first elected in 2020.

References 

138